Jan Penc (born 31 January 1982) is a professional Czech football
player, who most recently played for FC Oberlausitz Neugersdorf

References
 
 
 Jan Penc at Footballdatabase
 Jan Penc at Fupa

1982 births
Living people
Czech footballers
Czech First League players
1. FK Příbram players
FC Vysočina Jihlava players
FK Bohemians Prague (Střížkov) players
Association football defenders
FC Oberlausitz Neugersdorf players
Footballers from Prague